Muuga may refer to several places in Estonia:

Muuga, Lääne-Viru County, a village in Vinni Parish, Lääne-Viru County
Muuga Manor
Muuga, Viimsi Parish, a village in Viimsi Parish, Harju County
Muuga Harbour
Muuga Bay
Muuga aedlinn (Muuga garden city), district of Maardu